Midila crenulimargo is a moth in the family Crambidae. It was described by Eugene G. Munroe in 1970. It is found in Peru.

References

Moths described in 1970
Taxa named by Eugene G. Munroe
Midilinae